The 2. Basketball Bundesliga is the second tier level league of professional club basketball in Germany. Before the 2007–08 season, the 2. Basketball Bundesliga consisted of two geographical divisions (North and South). Since 2007 the 2. Basketball Bundesliga now consists of the two hierarchical leagues, named ProA and ProB.  At the end of the season, the top two teams of the ProA qualify for the Basketball Bundesliga, and the teams positioned 15th and 16th are relegated to the lower league ProB.

2. Bundesliga champions until 2007 
For a list of champions after 2007, see ProA.

See also
ProA
ProB
Basketball in Germany

References 

 
1975 establishments in West Germany
Second level basketball leagues in Europe
Sports leagues established in 1975
Basketball leagues in Germany